The Great Alone is a 1922 American silent northern drama film directed by Jacques Jaccard and starring Monroe Salisbury, Walter Law and George Waggner.

Cast
 Monroe Salisbury as 	Silent Duval
 Laura Anson as 	Nadine Picard
 Walter Law as 	Winston Sassoon
 Maria Draga as Mary MacDonald
 George Waggner as	Bradley Carstairs
 Richard Cummings as 	MacDonald

References

Bibliography
 Connelly, Robert B. The Silents: Silent Feature Films, 1910-36, Volume 40, Issue 2. December Press, 1998.
 Munden, Kenneth White. The American Film Institute Catalog of Motion Pictures Produced in the United States, Part 1. University of California Press, 1997.

External links
 

1922 films
1922 drama films
1920s English-language films
American silent feature films
Silent American drama films
American black-and-white films
Films directed by Jacques Jaccard
1920s American films